Starring Boris Karloff was an American radio and television anthology series broadcast for 13 weeks, September–December 1949, on the ABC Television network. Boris Karloff was the host and occasional star, with music by organist George Henninger. Produced and directed by Charles Warburton, the series adapted short stories of mystery and suspense.

Production
Starring Boris Karloff aired as an ABC Radio series. In a practice that was then becoming prevalent, the radio show was doubled on television on ABC-TV. The same script was used for both programs, but was adapted and altered for each medium.

Beginning with the October 27 broadcast, the title of the series was changed to Mystery Playhouse Starring Boris Karloff. The 30-minute program was also known as Boris Karloff Presents and Presenting Boris Karloff.

Episodes
Radio historian John Dunning described Starring Boris Karloff as a horror anthology series that adapted well-known short stories by Arch Oboler, Cornell Woolrich and others. Sources for episode information include Jerry Haendiges Vintage Radio Logs.

See also
1949-50 United States network television schedule

References

External links
Starring Boris Karloff at IMDB
Starring Boris Karloff at the Digital Deli

1940s American anthology television series
1949 American television series debuts
1949 American television series endings
1949 radio programme debuts
1949 radio programme endings
ABC radio programs
American Broadcasting Company original programming
1940s American drama television series
American radio dramas
Anthology radio series
Black-and-white American television shows
Boris Karloff